Andrea Seno (born February 1, 1966) is an Italian former footballer who played as a midfielder. He made nearly 300 appearances in the Italian professional leagues, including 90 in Serie A.

References

1966 births
Living people
Italian footballers
Association football midfielders
Calcio Padova players
Venezia F.C. players
Treviso F.B.C. 1993 players
Como 1907 players
Calcio Foggia 1920 players
Inter Milan players
Bologna F.C. 1909 players
Serie A players
Serie B players